Plinthodes is a genus of broad-nosed weevils in the beetle family Curculionidae. There are at least two described species in Plinthodes.

Species
These two species belong to the genus Plinthodes:
 Plinthodes foveirostris (Chittenden, 1925) i c
 Plinthodes taeniatus (LeConte, 1857) i c g b
Data sources: i = ITIS, c = Catalogue of Life, g = GBIF, b = Bugguide.net

References

Further reading

 
 
 
 

Entiminae
Articles created by Qbugbot